This is the discography of the Christian contemporary group Jump5.  It consists of 7 studio albums, 22 singles, 4 video releases, 9 music videos, 5 compilation albums and 2 remix albums.

Albums

Studio albums

Christmas albums 
 All the Joy in the World (2002)
 Rock This Christmas (2005)

Compilation albums 
 The Very Best of Jump5 (2005) 
 Shining Star (2005)
 Top 5 Hits (2006)
 Greatest Hits (2008)
 The Ultimate Collection (2009)

Remix albums 
 Mix It Up (2004)
 Christmas Like This (2007)

Singles

DVDs 
 Jump5 (2002) (GOLD) 
 All the Time in the World (2002) (GOLD)
 Start Dancin' With Jump5 (2003) (SILVER)
 Jump5: Hello & Goodbye (Limited Edition) (2007)

Music videos 
 Spinnin' Around
 God Bless the USA
 All I Can Do
 Beauty and the Beast
 Do Ya
 Aloha, E Komo Mai
 Welcome
 It's a Beautiful World
 Hawaiian Roller Coaster Ride
 Dance with Me

In popular media

Soundtracks 
 Sleepover - "Freeze Frame"
 The Lizzie McGuire Movie - "Shining Star"
 Ice Princess - "Just a Dream"
 Ella Enchanted - "Walking on Sunshine"
 Brother Bear - "Welcome"
 Lilo & Stitch - "Aloha, E Komo Mai"

A DVD release of Disney's Beauty and the Beast included an extra with them singing the title song, Beauty and the Beast.

"Aloha, E Komo Mai" features the voice of Chris Sanders in his role as Stitch.

Compilations 
 Disney Channel Hits: Vol 1
 Disneymania
 Disneymania 2
 Disneymania 3
 Family Channel Hits: Vol 1
 Kim Possible Soundtrack
 The Lizzie McGuire Soundtrack
 That's So Raven Soundtrack
 Radio Disney Jingle Jams
 Radio Disney Jams 4, 5, and 6
 Radio Disney Ultimate Jams
 Mega Movie Mix
 Disney's Lilo & Stitch Island Favorites featuring songs from Lilo & Stitch 2: Stitch Has a Glitch (Disney 61379-7) [released in 2005]

Video games 
 Disney's Extreme Skate Adventure (2003) - "Spinnin' Around"
 MC Groovz Dance Craze (2004) - "Walking on Sunshine"
 Jump5 Video Director (2004)

References 

Discographies of American artists
Pop music group discographies
Christian music discographies